Hypocharassus gladiator is a species of fly in the family Dolichopodidae.

Distribution
United States

References

Hydrophorinae
Diptera of North America
Insects described in 1879
Taxa named by Josef Mik